Callopistria maillardi is a moth of the family Noctuidae. The species can be found throughout central, eastern and southern Africa, including the islands of the Indian Ocean, Yemen, Chagos islands, Pakistan, India, Sri Lanka, southern China, in Hawaii, Hong Kong, New Zealand, the Society Islands, Sulawesi, as well as Queensland in Australia.

Description
Its wingspan is about 40 mm. Antennae of male with three spatulate hairs on the curved portion. Legs very densely clothed with long hair. Head and thorax clothed with dark ferrugineous and white hair. Abdomen paler with ferrous colored dorsal tufts. Forewings more varied with reddish. The veins and lines reddish. Antemedial line more angulated. There is a medial crenulate black line. Ventral side of hindwings with more crenulated postmedial line.

Ecology
The larvae feed on Adiantum, Lygodium, Pellaea, Nephrolepis biserrata, and Asplenium nidus.

References

External links
Species info

Caradrinini
Moths described in 1862
Owlet moths of Africa
Moths of Asia
Moths of Oceania